Jan Arend Bultman (born 26 May 1942 in Deventer, Overijssel) is a former water polo player from The Netherlands. He was a member of the Dutch Men's National Team that finished in eighth position at the 1964 Summer Olympics in Tokyo, Japan.

References

1942 births
Living people
Dutch male water polo players
Olympic water polo players of the Netherlands
Water polo players at the 1964 Summer Olympics
Sportspeople from Deventer